The King's School, Macclesfield, is an independent school for day pupils in Prestbury, Cheshire, England, and a member of the Headmasters' and Headmistresses' Conference. It was founded in 1502 by Sir John Percyvale, a former Lord Mayor of London, as Macclesfield Grammar School.

History
The King's School was founded in 1502 within the Church of St Michael and All Angels, Macclesfield. It was re-founded by Edward VI in 1552 as the "Free Grammar School of King Edward VI". It moved to Cumberland Street, 300 metres further from the town square, in 1844. In July 2020 the school moved to a new location adjacent to its long-held Derby Playing Fields, on the outskirts of Macclesfield.

In 1844 a Modern School, with a more commercial and technical curriculum, was built by the governors to run in tandem with the Grammar School. It merged with the Grammar School in 1912.

The school operated as a direct-grant school and offered scholarships for boys from state elementary schools from 1926 until 1966, when its application to continue as a direct grant grammar school was refused and it became fully independent.

The boys' junior school was opened in 1947. In 1993 girls from age 11 to 16 were admitted and housed with co-educational juniors, and later infants, at the old Macclesfield High School site on Fence Avenue. The Sixth Form had been co-educational since 1986.

The King's School's 2020 development plans involved closing the two existing school sites in Macclesfield and opening a new single site school in Prestbury, near Macclesfield. The development plans involved selling off the two existing school sites for housing development to fund the new school site. The school acquired greenbelt farmland adjacent to its Derby Fields site for which it subsequently sought planning permission in order to develop the existing school site and the farmland for housing. Planning permission was granted to the school to build more than 250 houses on the greenbelt land in Macclesfield in July 2016. The  new school was built on green belt land in nearby Prestbury. Planning permission for all sites was confirmed when the Secretary of State declined to call in the plans for further scrutiny in September 2016.
In July 2020 King's School left Macclesfield after more than 500 years of continuous operation in the town and relocated to Prestbury.

Academia
The school follows the National Curriculum for GCSE in Years 10–11 and A-Levels in the sixth form. In 2012, pupils achieved A*/A in 41% of all exams and A* – B in three-quarters of exams. Pupils achieved the best-ever GCSE results in 2012 with 33% of grades at A* grade, more than 63% of grades at A*/A and 86% at A* – B grade.

In 2011, pupils achieved 75% A* to B grade at A-level, with a 99.7% pass rate, and 60% As and A*s at GCSE.

Extra-curricular activities

Music
In 2003 the school's Foundation Choir won BBC Songs of Praise Choir of the Year. It takes bi-annual trips to perform across Europe, having visited Barcelona, Levico Terme, Strasbourg, Lake Geneva and Budapest. In 2016 the choir performed in Prague. The choir and numerous bands also perform at nearby St Michael's Church. The school's music department is equipped with a recording studio and practice rooms and offers instrumental lessons to the students.
The department also performs musicals such as The Revenge of Sherlock Holmes, a West End musical, in 2012.

Drama
The school performs two to three plays a year; one by the Boys' Division/Sixth Form, one by the Girls' Division, and one by the Juniors. Recent plays include Cinders, Arabian Nights, and The Ramayana.

School trips
Trips abroad are arranged by individual departments, including those by the History and Classics departments, in addition to annual foreign language exchange visits. Pupils are involved in biennial World Challenge Expeditions and recent expeditions have been to Morocco, Ecuador, India and most recently Namibia.

The school's Outdoor Activities Club organises regular trips to Yorkshire or the Peak District, that include walking, climbing and caving.

Sports
School sports include rugby, hockey, netball, cheerleading, and cricket.

Headmasters

1502–1533: William Bridges (first)
1533–1560: John Bold
1560–1588: John Brownswerde
1588–1631: William Legh
1631–1648: Thomas Bolde
1648–1662: Henry Crosedale
1662–1666: Edward Powell
1666–1674: Ralph Gorse
1674–1676: Thomas Brancker
1676–1689: Rev. John Ashworth
1689–1690: Caleb Pott
1690–1704: Timothy Dobson
1704–1717: Edward Denham
1717–1720: George Hammond
1720–1745: Rev. Joseph Allen
1745: Edward Ford
1745–1749: Christopher Atkinson
1749–1774: Rowland Atkinson
1774–1790: Henry Ingles
1790–1828: David Davies
1828: Thomas Bourdillon
1828–1837: Rev. Francis Stonehewer Newbold
1849–1872: Rev. Thomas Brooking Cornish
1837–1849: William Alexander Osborn
1880–1910: Darwin Wilmot
1910–1933 : Francis Duntz Evans
1933–1966: Thomas Taylor Shaw
1966–1987: Alan Cooper
1987–2001: Adrian Silcock
2001–2011: Stephen Coyne
2011–2020: Simon Hyde
2020–present: Jason Slack

Notable former pupils
 
 Thomas Newton (born 1542; died 1607), English clergyman and poet 
 John Blundell, economist
 Rev. Thomas Taylor, priest and historian
 John Bradshaw, chief prosecutor of Charles I and the first man to sign his death warrant
 Charles Gordon Hewitt (born 1885; died 1920), British-Canadian consulting zoologist
 James Hope (born 1801; died 1841), cardiologist and physician
 Hewlett Johnson, Dean of Canterbury, known as the Red Dean
 Sir Eric Jones KCMG, CB, CBE (born 1907; died 1986), former Director of GCHQ 
 Tom Margerison (born 1923; died 2014), Founder of the New Scientist, journalist at the Sunday Times and BBC Broadcaster
 Alan Jones (born 1927; died 2009), Scottish first-class cricketer
 The Lord Beith of Berwick-on-Tweed, Alan Beith (born 1943), politician
 Duncan Robinson CBE (born 1943), Master of Magdalene College, Cambridge and Chairman of the Henry Moore Foundation
 Christian Blackshaw (born 1949), classical pianist
 Robert Longden (born 1951), British actor, director, composer and librettist.
 Steve Smith (born 1951), Captain of England (28 caps) and the British Lions rugby union teams
 Guy Ryder CBE (born 1956), political scientist and Director-General of the International Labour Organization
 Ian Curtis (born 1956; died 1980), of the post-punk band Joy Division
 Stephen Morris (born 1957), of the post-punk band Joy Division
 Jon Craig (born 1957), Chief Political Correspondent of Sky News 
 Michael Jackson (born 1958), former Channel 4 Chief Executive
 Guy Laurence (born 1961), CEO of Chelsea Football Club; former CEO of Vodafone UK
 Peter Moores (born 1962), England cricket coach
 Andy Bird CBE (born 1964), Chairman, Walt Disney International
 Oliver Holt (born 1966), former Chief Sports Correspondent for The Times and current Chief Sports Writer for the Daily Mirror
 Vice Admiral Jerry Kyd (born 1967), Fleet Commander of the Royal Navy, former Captain of HMS Queen Elizabeth
 Richard Pool-Jones (born 1969), former England rugby union and Stade Francais player
 Stanley Chow (born 1974), artist and illustrator 
 Helen Marten (born 1985), artist and Turner Prize winner 
 Matthew Falder (born 1988), convicted child sex offender
 Matty Healy (born 1989), singer in The 1975
 Tommy Taylor (born 1991), England rugby union capped player (hooker) with London Wasps
 Jonathan Marsden (born 1993), first-class cricketer, teacher at Harrow School
 Tom Hudson (born 1994), professional rugby player at Gloucester Rugby
 Blake Richardson (born 1999), musician, member of British band New Hope Club
 Cameron Redpath (born 1999), professional rugby player at Bath Rugby
 Alex Denny (born 2000), professional footballer at Everton FC

Publications
Published books by King's School teachers:

References

Ancient grammar schools of Cheshire
Private schools in the Borough of Cheshire East
1502 establishments in England
Educational institutions established in the 1500s
Member schools of the Headmasters' and Headmistresses' Conference
Diamond schools